Winn Memorial Library, also known as the Woburn Public Library (1876–79) is a National Historic Landmark in Woburn, Massachusetts. Designed by architect H. H. Richardson, the Romanesque Revival building was a bequest of the Winn family. It houses the Woburn Public Library, an institution that was established in 1856.

Architecture

The library is properly called the "Woburn Public Library." The Winn family paid to construct the building and provide an endowment for the library but specifically requested that it not be named for them. Nevertheless, Richardson signed his plans "Winn Library," and it remains known in architectural circles as "Winn Memorial Library." The inscription in the entrance porch reads: "This building was erected in memory of Jonathan Bowers Winn from funds bequeathed by his son, for the use, benefit and improvement of the people of Woburn."

It was built between 1876 and 1879 and was the first in a series of libraries designed by Richardson. In it he established a characteristic basilical plan for such buildings: an off-axis entrance marked by a staircase tower; a vestibule opening into a high-ceilinged reception area; reading room(s) adjacent to the stacks; and an optional art gallery. The building was designated a National Historic Landmark in 1987 in recognition of its architectural significance.

The library's main (south) facade presents a long, two-story stack wing to the west (left), slit windows on the first story with a strip of clerestory windows separated by columns above, all below a peaked roof. The gable-ended crossing (center) features a trio of arched double windows on the first story, a line of seven arched single windows above, and an attached High Victorian tower. On the opposite side of the tower is the arch of the entrance porch. The easternmost section is an attached two-and-a-half-story octagonal wing that houses the museum. The building's polychromatic exterior is constructed of brownstone trimmed with lighter stone, sometimes laid in bands, and set in alternating colors over the main arches and the entrance porch. This is all beneath a red tile roof trimmed with bronze cresting, with crocketed ribs on the roofs of the tower and museum.

The interior features a reception room/picture gallery with the museum to the right and a trio of reading rooms to the left. Beyond the reading rooms are the two-story stacks that feature a tall 6-arch arcade on each side, topped by a wooden barrel-vaulted ceiling. There are curved staircases at the four corners of the stacks, in addition to the main stair in the tower.

A statue of native son and notable scientist Sir Benjamin Thompson, Count Rumford, stands on the main lawn before the library.

See also
National Register of Historic Places listings in Middlesex County, Massachusetts
List of National Historic Landmarks in Massachusetts

References

Further reading
 Annual report of the Woburn Public Library. 1890-1894
 William R. Cutter. "A Model Village Library." New England Magazine v.1, no.6, February 1890, pp. 617–25.
 Carolyn Pitts, "NHL Architecture Theme", in CRM Bulletin, Cultural Resources Management, A National Park Service Technical Bulletin, Volume 10: No. 6, December 1987.
 Margaret Henderson Floyd, Architecture After Richardson: Regionalism Before Modernism, University of Chicago Press, 1994, page 192. .

External links
 Winn Memorial Library from Great Buildings.
 Winn Memorial Library from ArchiPlanet.

Library buildings completed in 1879
Public libraries in Massachusetts
Richardsonian Romanesque architecture in Massachusetts
Henry Hobson Richardson buildings
National Historic Landmarks in Massachusetts
Woburn, Massachusetts
Libraries on the National Register of Historic Places in Massachusetts
1856 establishments in Massachusetts
Libraries in Middlesex County, Massachusetts
National Register of Historic Places in Middlesex County, Massachusetts